Alphonse Laverrière (16 May 1872 – 11 March 1954) was a Swiss architect.

He studied at the École nationale supérieure des beaux-arts and was professor at the Swiss Federal Institute of Technology in Zurich.

In 1912, he won a gold medal together with Eugène-Edouard Monod in the art competitions of the Olympic Games. They created a "Building plan of a modern stadium".

Between 1922 and 1951, Laverrière designed the Bois-de-Vaux Cemetery at Lausanne and is buried there.

Works 

 Lausanne railway station
 Federal Supreme Court of Switzerland
 Cantonal Botanical Museum and Gardens

References

External links

 Profile

1872 births
1954 deaths
Swiss architects
Olympic gold medalists in art competitions
Academic staff of ETH Zurich
Medalists at the 1912 Summer Olympics
Olympic competitors in art competitions